Sultan Mahmud Begada or Mahmud Shah I was the most prominent Sultan of the Gujarat Sultanate. Raised to the throne at young age, he successfully captured Pavagadh and Junagadh forts in battles which gave him his name Begada. He established Champaner as the capital. He was responsible for the destruction of the Dwarkadhish Temple in Dwarka, Gujarat, one of the Char Dhams considered sacred by Hindus.

Names
His full name was Abu'l Fath Nasir-ud-Din Mahmud Shah I. He was born Fat'h Khan or Fateh Khan. He titled himself, Sultân al-Barr, Sultân al-Bahr, Sultan of the Land, Sultan of the Sea.

Of the origin of Mahmúd's surname Begra or Begarha, two explanations are given in Bird’s History of Gujarát (p. 202) and Mirăt-i-Ahmedi (Persian Text, pp. 74):
 From his mustachios being large and twisted like a bullock's horn, such a bullock being called Begado.
 That the word comes from the Gujaráti be, two, and gadh, a fort, the people giving him this title in honour of his capture of two forts; Junagadh of Girnar (1472) and Pavagadh of Champaner (1484).

Early life
On the death of Kutb-ud-dín Ahmad Shah II, the nobles raised to the throne his uncle Dáúd Khan, son of Ahmad Shah I. But as Dáúd appointed low-born men to high offices and committed improper acts. Within a short period of seven or twenty-seven days, he was deposed, and in 1459 his half-brother Fateh Khán, the son of Muhammad Shah II by Bíbi Mughli, a daughter of Jám Júna of Samma dynasty ruling from Thatta in Sindh; was seated on the throne at the age of little more than thirteen with the title of Mahmúd Sháh I.

The close connection of Fateh Khán with the saintly Sháh Álam is frequently mentioned by with Gujarát chroniclers. According to the Mirăt-i-Sikandari (Persian Text, 66–70) of his two daughters Jám Júna intended Bíbi Mughli the more beautiful for the Saint and Bíbi Mirghi the less comely for the Sultán. By bribing the Jám's envoys the king secured the prettier sister. The enraged Saint was consoled by his father who said: My son, to you will come both the cow and the calf. After Muhammad Shah II's death, fear of Kutb-ud-dín Ahmad Shah II's designs against the young Fateh Khán forced Bíbi Mughli to seek safety with her sister, and on her sister's death she married the Saint. Kutb-ud-dín made several attempts to seize Fateh Khán. But by the power of the Saint when Kutb-ud-dín attempted to seize him, Fateh Khán in body as well as in dress became a girl. According to one account Kutb-ud-dín met his death in an attempt to carry off Fateh Khán. As he rode a mad camel, the king struck at the phantom, and his sword cleaving the air gashed his knee. This was the Saint's sword, which against his will, for he knew it would be the death of the king, Kutb-ud-dín forced Sháh Álam to bind round him before the battle of Kapadvanj against Mahmud Khilji of Malwa Sultanate.

Reign

Early years

Soon his uncle Dáúd Khan died. Shortly after certain of the nobles including Seiful Mulk, Kabír-ud-dín Sultáni surnamed Akd-ul-Mulk, Burhán-ul-Mulk and Hisám-ul-Mulk represented to the Sultán that the minister Shaâbán Imád-ul-Mulk contemplated treason and wished to set his son on the throne. Having seized and imprisoned the minister in the Bhadra Fort and set five hundred of their trusted retainers as guards over him, the rebels retired to their homes. At nightfall Abdulláh, the chief of the elephant stables, going to the young Sultán represented to him that the nobles who had imprisoned Imád-ul-Mulk were the real traitors and had determined to place Habíb Khán, an uncle of the Sultán's, on the throne. The Sultán consulting his mother and some of his faithful friends ordered Abdulláh at daybreak to equip all his elephants in full armour and draw them up in the square before the Bhadra. He then seated himself on the throne and in a voice of feigned anger ordered one of the courtiers to bring out Shaâbán Imád-ul-Mulk, that he might wreak his vengeance upon him. As these orders were not obeyed the Sultán rose, and walking up the Bhadra called: “Bring out Shaâbán!” The guards brought forth Imád-ul-Mulk, and the Sultán ordered his fetters to be broken. Some of the nobles’ retainers made their submission to the Sultán, others fled and hid themselves. In the morning, hearing what had happened, the refractory nobles marched against the Sultán. Many advised the Sultán to cross the Sabarmati river by the postern gate and retire from the city, and, after collecting an army, to march against the nobles. Giving no ear to these counsels the young Sultán ordered Abdulláh to charge the advancing nobles with his six hundred elephants. The charge dispersed the malcontents who fled and either hid themselves in the city or betook themselves to the country. Some were killed, some were trampled by the Sultán's orders under the elephants’ feet, and one was pardoned.

In 1461 or 1462, according to Farishtah, Nizam Shah Bahmani (r. 1461–1463), the sultan of the Bahmani Sultanate in Deccan, whose country had been invaded by Sultán Mahmud Khilji of Malwa Sultanate, applied for help to the Gujarát king. Mahmúd Sháh at once started to Nizám Sháh's aid, and on his way receiving another equally pressing letter from the Deccan sovereign, and being joined by the Báhmani general Khwájáh Jehán Gáwán, he pushed on with all speed by way of Burhanpur. When Sultán Mahmúd Khilji heard of his approach, he retired to his own country by way of Gondwana, from thirst and from the attacks of the Gonds, losing 5000 to 6000 men. The king of Gujarát, after receiving the thanks of the Deccan sovereign, returned to his own dominions. In 1462, Sultán Mahmúd Khilji made another incursion into the Deccan at the head of 90,000 horse, plundering and laying waste the country as far as Daulatabad. Again the Deccan sovereign applied for help to Mahmúd Sháh, and on hearing of Mahmúd's advance the Málwa Sultán retired a second time to his own dominions. Mahmúd Sháh wrote to the Málwa Sultán to desist from harassing the Deccan, threatening, in case of refusal, to march at once upon Mandu. His next expedition was against the pirate zamíndárs of the hill fort of Barur and the bandar of Dûn or Dahanu, whose fort he took, and after imposing an annual tribute allowed the chief to continue to hold his hundred villages.

Junagadh (Girnar)

Mahmúd Sháh next turned his thoughts to the conquest of the mountain citadel, Uparkot, of Girnar hill near Junagadh in Sorath (now in Saurashtra region of Gujarat). In 1467, he attacked the fort of Junágaḍh, and receiving the submission of Ra Mandalika III, the Chudasama ruler, returned to his capital. In the following year, hearing that the Junágaḍh chief continued to visit his temple in state with a golden umbrella and other ensigns of royalty, Mahmúd despatched an army to Junágaḍh, and the chief sent the umbrella to the king, accompanied by fitting presents. In 1469, Mahmúd once more sent an army to ravage Sorath, with the intention of finally conquering both Junágaḍh and Girnár. While Mahmúd was on the march the Rá Mandalika suddenly joined him, and asking why the Sultán was so bent on his destruction when he had committed no fault, agreed to do whatever Mahmúd might command. The king replied there is no fault like infidelity, and ordered the Rá to embrace Islam. The chief, now thoroughly alarmed, fled by night and made his way into Girnár. In 1472–73, after a siege of nearly two years, forced by the failure of his stores, he quitted the fort and handing the keys to the king, converted to Islam. Though the Rá's life was spared, Sorath from this date became a crown possession, and was governed by an officer appointed by the king and stationed at Junágaḍh.

At the close of the war, in 1479, Mahmúd Sháh repaired the fort Jehánpanáh, the present outer or town wall of Junágaḍh, and, charmed with the beauty of the neighbourhood, settled sayads and learned men at Junágaḍh and other towns in Sorath. He induced the nobles to build houses, himself raised a palace and made the new city his capital under the name of Mustafábad and enforced his claims as overlord on all the neighbouring chiefs. In the times of Ahmad Shah I, these chieftains, including even the Junágaḍh Rá himself, had paid tribute. But Mahmúd established rule so firmly that the duty of collecting the tribute was entrusted to an officer permanently settled in the country. The author of the Mirăt-i-Sikandari dilates on the dense woods round Junágaḍh, full of mango, ráen, jámbu, gúlar, ámli, and áonla trees (Mangifera indica, Mimusops hexandra, Eugenia jambolana, Ficus glomerata, Tamarindus indica, and Emblica officinalis.), and notes that this forest tract was inhabited by Khánts.

In 1480, when Mahmúd Sháh was at Junágaḍh, Khudáwand Khán and others, who were weary of the king's constant warfare, incited his eldest son Áhmed Khan to assume royal power. But Imád-ul-Mulk, by refusing to join, upset their plans, and on the king's return the conspiracy was stamped out.

Champaner (Pavagadh)

In 1479, Mahmúd Sháh sent an army to ravage Champaner then held by Khichi Chauhan Rajputs which titled themselves as Raval. About this time, hearing that the neighbourhood was infested with robbers, he founded the city of Mehmúdábád (now Mahemdavad) on the banks of the Vatrak river, about eighteen miles south of Áhmedábád. Several monuments in Mahemdavad are credited to him including Bhammariyo Kuvo, a well; Chanda-Suraj No Mehal, a palace and Roza-Rozi.

In 1482 there was a partial famine in Gujarát, and the Chámpáner country being exempt from scarcity the commandant of Morámli or Rasúlábád, a post in the Gáekwár's Sáonli district on the Chámpáner frontier, made several forays across the border. In return the chief attacked the commandant and defeated him, killing most of his men and capturing two elephants and several horses. On hearing this Mahmúd Sháh set out for Baroda (now Vadodara) with a powerful army. When Mahmúd reached Baroda the Rával of Chámpáner, becoming alarmed, sent ambassadors and sued for forgiveness. The king rejected his overtures, saying: "Except the sword and the dagger no message shall pass between me and you." The Rával made preparations for a determined resistance, and sent messengers to summon Ghiás-ud-dín Khilji of Málwa Sultanate to his aid. To prevent this junction Mahmúd Sháh entrusted the siege to his nobles and marched to Dahod, on which Sultán Ghiás-ud-dín withdrew to Mándu. On his return from Dahod, the Sultán began building a Jáma Mosque at Chámpáner to show that he would not leave the place till he had taken the hill-fort of Pavagadh. After the siege had lasted more than twenty months (April 1483–December 1484), the Mahmud's soldiers noticed that for an hour or two in the morning most of the soldiers of Raval were off duty bathing and dressing. A morning assault was planned and the first gate carried. Then Malik Ayáz Sultáni finding a practicable breach passed through with some of his men and took the great gate. The Rával and his Rájputs rushed out in a fierce but unavailing charge. The Rával and his minister Dúngarshi fell wounded into the conqueror's hands, and, on refusing to embrace Islám, were put to death. Pavagadh was conquered on 21 November 1484. The Rával's son, who was entrusted to Seif-ul-Mulk, and converted to Islam, afterwards, in the reign of Muzaffar Sháh (1523–1526), was ennobled by the title of Nizám-ul-Mulk.

On the capture of Pávágaḍh, Mahmúd Sháh built a wall round the town of Chámpáner, and made it his capital under the name of Muhammadábád. Under Mahmúd's orders the neighbourhood became stocked with mangoes, pomegranates, figs, grapes, sugarcane, plantains, oranges, custard apples, khirnis or ráens (Mimusops indica or hexandra), jackfruit, and cocoapalms, as well as with roses, chrysanthemums, jasmins, champás, and sweet pandanus. A sandal grove near Chámpáner is said to have had trees large enough to help his nobles to build their mansions. At the instance of the Sultán a Khurásáni beautified one of the gardens with fountains and cascades. A Gujaráti named Hálur learning the principle improved on his master's design in a garden about four miles west of Chámpáner, which in his honour still bears the name Halol. It took 23 years to build the town. The town was conquered by the Mughal Empire under Humayun in 1535.

The magnificent Jama mosque of Champaner is considered as one of the finest architectural edifices in Gujarat. It is an imposing structure on a high plinth with two tall minarets 30 m tall, 172 pillars and seven mihrabs.  The central dome, the placement of balconies and carved entrance gates with fine stone jalis. Other Champaner structures attributed to the Begada period are the Kevada Masjid, Citadel Jahanpanah, Shahar ki Masjid, Mandvi the customs house, Nagina Masjid, Bava Man's Masjid, Khajuri Masjid, Ek Minar Masjid, and the Lila Gumbaz. Champaner-Pavagadh Archaeological Park is now UNESCO World Heritage Site.

Last years
In 1494–95 Mahmúd went against Bahádur Khán Gíláni, a vassal of the Bahmani Sultanate, who from Goa and Dabhol had harassed the Gujarát harbours. Gilani was earlier warned by attacking Mahim island (now in Mumbai) by 20 ships under Yakut the Abyssinian, his slave. This time he sent an army by land and 300 boats by sea to attack Dabhol under Malik Sarang Kivam-ul-Mulk. The Bahmani Sultán, fearing the consequences to himself, marched against Bahádur Khán, and, capturing him alive, struck off his head, and sent it to the Gujarát monarch, who returned to his own country.

In 1499–1500, hearing that Násir-ud-dín of Málwa had killed his father Ghiás-ud-dín and seated himself on the throne, the Sultán prepared to advance against him, but was appeased by Násir-ud-dín's humble attitude. The next seven years passed without any warlike expedition.

Battles with the Portuguese
Cambay (now Khambhat) was an important port of the Gujarat Sultanate. It was an essential intermediary in east–west trade, between the Red Sea, Egypt and Malacca. Gujaratis were important middlemen bringing spices from the Maluku Islands as well as silk from China, and then selling them to the Mamluks and Arabs. The Portuguese had entered India and were strengthening their presence in Arabian Sea. Mahmud Begada allied with the Kozhikkodu Samutiri (anglicised to Zamorin of Calicut) to defeat the Portuguese. He then asked his trade partners, the Egyptian Mamluk Sultanate of Cairo, for help. In 1508, near Daman, on his way to Chaul, Mahmúd heard of the victory gained in the Battle of Chaul over the Portuguese by the Gujarát squadron under Malik Ayyaz Sultáni, in concert with the Egyptian fleet of the Mamluks. In 1509, the Battle of Diu, a naval battle was fought near Diu port between the Portuguese Empire and a joint fleet of the Gujarat Sultanate under Malik Ayyaz, the Mamlûk Burji Sultanate of Egypt, the Zamorin of Calicut with support of the Turkish feet of Ottoman Empire, the Republic of Venice and the Republic of Ragusa (Dubrovnik). The Portuguese won the battle and the event marks the start of European colonialism in Asia.

Death

From 1508, Mahmúd remained at his capital till his death in December 1511 at the age of sixty-six years and three months, after a reign of fifty-four years and one month. Mahmúd was buried at Sarkhej Roza near Ahmedabad and received the after-death title of Khúdáigán-i-Halím or the Meek Lord.

Immediately before his death Sultán Mahmúd was informed that Sháh Ismáil Safawi of Persia had sent him a friendly embassy headed by Yádgár Beg Kazil-básh. As the Kazil-báshes were known to be Shia, the Sultán, who was a staunch Sunni, prayed that he might not be forced to see a Shia's face during his last days. His prayer was heard. He died before the Persian embassy entered the city.

During the last days of Sultán Mahmúd, Sayed Muhammad of Jaunpur, who claimed to be the Mahdi or Messiah, came from Jaunpur and lodged in Tájkhán Sálár's mosque near the Jamalpur gate of Áhmedábád. His sermons drew crowds, and were so persuasive that he gained a large body of followers, who believed his eloquence to be due to hál or inspiration. Mahmúd's ministers persuaded him not to see the Jaunpur preacher.

Administration

His religious ardour, his love of justice, his bravery, and his wise measures entitle Mahmúd to the highest place among the Gujarát kings. One of the measures which the Mirăt-i-Sikandari specially notices is his continuance of land grants to the son of the holder, and in cases where there was no male issue of half the grant to the daughter. His firm policy of never ousting the landholder except for proved oppression or exaction was productive of such prosperity that the revenue increased two, three and in some cases tenfold. The roads were safe from freebooters and trade was secure. A rule forbidding soldiers to borrow money at interest is favourably noticed. A special officer was appointed to make advances to needy soldiers with the power to recover from their pay in fixed instalments. Mahmúd also devoted much attention to the culture of fruit trees.

In Mahmúd's reign an instance is mentioned of the form of compensation. Some merchants bringing horses and other goods for sale from Irák and Khurásán were plundered in Sirohi limits. The king caused them to give in writing the price of their horses and stuffs, and paying them from his own treasury recovered the amount from the Rája of Sirohi.

His nobles
Mahmúd Begada's court was adorned by several pious and high-minded nobles. In life they vied with one another in generous acts; and after death, according to the Persian poet Urfi, they left their traces in the characters and carvings of stone walls and marble piles. First among these nobles the Mirăt-i-Sikandari (Persian Text, 132, 142) mentions Dáwar-ul-Mulk, whose god-fearing administration made his estates so prosperous that they were coveted by princes of the blood. As Thánadár of Amron in north Kathiawad, he spread Islám from Morbi to Bhuj, and after his death his fame as a spirit-ruling guardian drew hosts of sick and possessed to his shrine near Morbi. The second was Malik Ayáz, governor of Diu, who built the strong fortress afterwards reconstructed by the Portuguese. He also built a tower on an under-water rock, and from the tower drew a massive iron chain across the mouth of the harbour. A substantial bridge over the creek, that runs through the island of Diu, was afterwards destroyed by the Portuguese. The third was Khudáwand Khán Ālím, the founder of Ālímpura a suburb to the south of Áhmedábád, adorned with a mosque of sandstone and marble. He introduced the cultivation of melons figs and sugarcane into Gujarát from Bijapur. The fourth was Imád-ul-Mulk Āsas who founded Isanpur, a suburb between Sháh Álam's suburb of Islámpur and Vatva (all now in Ahmedabad), and planted along the road groves of khirnis and mangoes. The fifth was Tájkhán Sálár, so loved of his peers that after his death none of them would accept his title. The sixth was Malik Sárang Kiwám-ul-Mulk, a Rájput by birth, the founder of the suburb of Sarangpur and its mosque to the east of Áhmedábád. The seventh and eighth were the Khurásáni brothers Aâzam and Moâzzam, who built a cistern, a mosque, and a their tomb between Vasna and Sarkhej.

Family
Besides Khalíl Khán, who succeeded him, Mahmúd had three sons: Muhammad Kála, Ápá Khán, and Áhmed Khán. Kála, son of Ráni Rúp Manjhri died during his father's lifetime as did his mother, who was buried in Mánek Chowk in Áhmedábád in the building known as the Ráni's Hazíra. The second son Ápá Khán was caught trespassing in a noble's harím, and was ordered by the Sultán to be poisoned. The third son was the Áhmed Khán whom Khudáwand Khán sought to raise to the throne during Sultán Mahmúd's lifetime.

In culture
Some European travellers circulated popular tales about him. One of these tales told that he was given mild poisons from his childhood which had made him poisonous and immune to poisons and those became the source for the English satirist Samuel Butler's seventeenth-century lines: "The Prince of Cambay's daily food/ Is asp and basilisk and toad". There are various other stories about his good appetite, some of which are noted by modern historians too. According to  Satish Chandra, Mahmud used to eat lot of food during the day and meat patties (Samosas) were kept at his bedside by his servants at night in case he felt hungry.

References

Begada, Mahmud
Begada, Mahmud
15th-century Indian monarchs
16th-century Indian monarchs
Gujarat sultans
People from Ahmedabad